Fernando Sánchez Polack (11 August 1920 – 24 January 1982) was a Spanish actor. He appeared in more than 110 films and television shows between 1959 and 1982, mostly of them as a supporting character in Spaghetti Western films. He starred in the 1966 film La caza, which won the Silver Bear for Best Director at the 16th Berlin International Film Festival.

On 1 December 1981 he was hospitalized from a paraplegia at Residencia Sanitaria Provincial and he died on 24 January 1982 aged 61 from a cardiac arrest.

Selected filmography

 Los tramposos (1959) - Ayudante truhán
 La fiel infantería (1960) - Sargento Asterio
 Los económicamente débiles (1960)
 Trío de damas (1960) - Horacio, un basurero
 Don Mendo's Revenche (1962) - Barón de Vedia
 The Balcony of the Moon (1962)
 Weeping for a Bandit (1964) - Antonio
 A Fistful of Dollars (1964) - Rojo Gang Member Crushed by Wine Cask (uncredited)
 I due violenti (1964) - Hombre de Barnes
 Los dinamiteros (1964) - Obrero en mausoleo
 Minnesota Clay (1964) - (uncredited)
 Búsqueme a esa chica (1964) - Mariano
 Jesse James' Kid (1965)
 The Art of Living (1965)
 Posición avanzada (1966) - Sargento Díaz
 With the East Wind (1966) - Francisco Vázquez
 Nuevo en esta plaza (1966) - Torero
 Nueve cartas a Berta (1966) - Padre Echarri
 La caza (1966) - Juan
 La busca (1966) - Tomás
 The Drums of Tabu (1966) - Anahita's Father (uncredited)
 The Ugly Ones (1966)
 The Big Gundown (1966) - Sheriff of Willow Creek City (uncredited)
 Django Does Not Forgive (1966)
 Ballad of a Gunman (1967) - Saloon Owner (uncredited)
 Bewitched Love (1967) - Padre de Candelas
 Crónica de nueve meses (1967) - Eugenio - conductor del autobús
 De cuerpo presente (1967) - Jefe de policía
 Novios 68 (1967) - Guardia urbano
 Club de solteros (1967) - Paco
 Peppermint Frappé (1967) - Patient (uncredited)
 Les têtes brûlées (1967)
 Los flamencos (1968)
 Los subdesarrollados (1968) - Jefe de bomberos
 La dinamita está servida (1968) - Pepe
 Stress-es tres-tres (1968) - Juan
 Long-Play (1968) - Jacinto
 Tiempos de Chicago (1969) - Rico
 Pagó cara su muerte (1969)
 Adiós cordera (1969) - Don Julián
 Blood in the Bullring (1969) - Félix
 Macabre (1969) - Comisario
 Los desafíos (1969) - Benito (segment 2)
 El ángel (1969) - Delincuente
 A Bullet for Sandoval (1969) - Mexican Officer (uncredited)
 Los escondites (1969)
 Homicidios en Chicago (1969)
 El niño y el potro (Más allá de río Miño) (1969) - Don Lorenzo - alcalde
 The Pizza Triangle (1970) - District Head of Communist Party
 Il trapianto (1970)
 La ley de una raza (1970)
 El bosque del lobo (1970) - Vilairo
 The Wind's Fierce (1970) - Pedro
 Las melancólicas (1971)
 20,000 dólares por un cadáver (1971)
 Captain Apache (1971) - Guitarist 
 The House of the Doves (1972) - Sirviente de Fernando
 La garbanza negra, que en paz descanse... (1972) - Bombero jefe 
 The Cannibal Man (1972) - Señor Ambrosio
 Pancho Villa (1972) - Manuel
 El Retorno de Walpurgis (1973) - Maurice, Waldemar's valet
 The Guerrilla (1973) - Guerrillero
 La leyenda del alcalde de Zalamea (1973) - Alguacil
 Vengeance of the Zombies (1973) - Augusto
 Murder in a Blue World (1973) - Rehabilitado
 Verflucht dies Amerika (1973)
 The King is the Best Mayor (1974) - Yuntero
 Cuando los niños vienen de Marsella (1974) - Padre de Titi
 The Mummy's Revenge (1975) - Anchaff
 The Great House (1975)
 Pim, pam, pum... ¡fuego! (1975)
 Solo ante el Streaking (1975) - Servando
 El poder del deseo (1975) - Vecino
 Manuela (1976) - El Moreno
 La lozana andaluza (1976)
 Secuestro (1976) - Guardia civil
 Más fina que las gallinas (1977)
 Foul Play (1977) - Mecánico del pueblo
 ¡Bruja, más que bruja! (1977) - Sacerdote
 Me siento extraña (1977) - Tomás
 Los Días del pasado (1978) - Lucio
 Un hombre llamado Flor de Otoño (1978) - Modesto
 Donde hay patrón... (1978) - Vargas
 Cartas de amor de una monja (1978) - Jerónimo
 Cabo de vara (1978)
 Seven Days in January (1979) - Sebastián Cifuentes
 La Sabina (1979) - Félix
 El lobo negro (1981)
 Buitres sobre la ciudad (1981) - Cullen
 Perdóname, amor (1982)

References

External links

1920 births
1982 deaths
Male actors from Madrid
Spanish male film actors
20th-century Spanish male actors
Male Spaghetti Western actors